In number theory, a Frobenius pseudoprime is a pseudoprime, whose definition was inspired by the quadratic Frobenius test described by Jon Grantham in a 1998 preprint and published in 2000. Frobenius pseudoprimes can be defined with respect to polynomials of degree at least 2, but they have been most extensively studied in the case of quadratic polynomials.

Frobenius pseudoprimes w.r.t. quadratic polynomials

A composite number n is a Frobenius  pseudoprime if and only if

 and

where  is the Jacobi symbol.

When condition (2) is satisfied, condition (3) becomes equivalent to

Therefore, Frobenius  pseudoprime  can be equivalently defined by conditions (1-2) and (3), or by conditions (1-2) and (3′).

Since conditions (2) and (3) hold for all primes which satisfy the simple condition (1), they can be used as a probable prime test.

Relations to other pseudoprimes
Every Frobenius  pseudoprime is also 
 a Lucas pseudoprime with parameters , since it is defined by conditions (1) and (2);
 a Dickson pseudoprime with parameters , since it is defined by conditions (1) and (3');
 a Fermat pseudoprime base  when .
Converse of none of these statements is true, making the Frobenius  pseudoprimes a proper subset of each of the sets of Lucas pseudoprimes and Dickson pseudoprimes with parameters , and Fermat pseudoprimes base  when . 
Furthermore, it follows that for the same parameters , a composite number is a Frobenius pseudoprime if and only if it is both Lucas and Dickson pseudoprime. In other words, for every fixed pair of parameters , the set of Frobenius pseudoprimes equals the intersection of the sets of Lucas and Dickson pseudoprimes.

While each Frobenius  pseudoprime is a Lucas pseudoprime, it is not necessarily a strong Lucas pseudoprime.

Analogous statements hold for other cubic polynomials of the form .

Examples
Frobenius pseudoprimes with respect to the Fibonacci polynomial  are determined in terms of the Fibonacci numbers  and Lucas numbers . Such Frobenius pseudoprimes form the sequence:

4181, 5777, 6721, 10877, 13201, 15251, 34561, 51841, 64079, 64681, 67861, 68251, 75077, 90061, 96049, 97921, 100127, 113573, 118441, 146611, 161027, 162133, 163081, 186961, 197209, 219781, 231703, 252601, 254321, 257761, 268801, 272611, 283361, 302101, 303101, 330929, 399001, 430127, 433621, 438751, 489601, ... .

Another case, Frobenius pseudoprimes with respect to the quadratic polynomial  can be determined using the Lucas  sequence and are:

119, 649, 1189, 4187, 12871, 14041, 16109, 23479, 24769, 28421, 31631, 34997, 38503, 41441, 48577, 50545, 56279, 58081, 59081, 61447, 75077, 91187, 95761, 96139, 116821, 127937, 146329, 148943, 150281, 157693, 170039, 180517, 188501, 207761, 208349, 244649, 281017, 311579, 316409, 349441, 350173, 363091, 371399, 397927, 423721, 440833, 459191, 473801, 479119, 493697, ... 

In this case, the first Frobenius pseudoprime with respect to the quadratic polynomial  is 119, which is also the first Lucas pseudoprime with respect to the same polynomial. Besides, .

The quadratic polynomial , i.e. , has sparser pseudoprimes as compared to many other simple quadratics. Using the same process as above, we get the sequence:
 13333, 44801, 486157, 1615681, 3125281, 4219129, 9006401, 12589081, 13404751, 15576571, 16719781, ….

Notice there are only 3 such pseudoprimes below 500000, while there are many Frobenius (1, −1) and (3, −1) pseudoprimes below 500000.

Every entry in this sequence is a Fermat pseudoprime to base 5 as well as a Lucas (3, −5) pseudoprime, but the converse is not true: 642001 is both a psp-5 and a Lucas (3,-5) pseudoprime, but is not a Frobenius (3, −5) pseudoprime. (note that Lucas pseudoprime for a  pair need not to be a Fermat pseudoprime for base ||, e.g. 14209 is a Lucas (1, −3) pseudoprime, but not a Fermat pseudoprime for base 3.

Strong Frobenius pseudoprimes
Strong Frobenius pseudoprimes are also defined.  Details on implementation for quadratic polynomials can be found in Crandall and Pomerance.

Pseudoprimality tests

The conditions defining Frobenius pseudoprime can be used for testing a given number n for probable primality. Often such tests do not rely on fixed parameters , but rather select them in a certain way depending on the input number n in order to decrease the proportion of false positives, i.e., composite numbers that pass the test. Sometimes such composite numbers are commonly called Frobenius pseudoprimes, although they may correspond to different parameters.

Using parameter selection ideas first laid out in Baillie and Wagstaff (1980)
as part of the Baillie–PSW primality test and used by Grantham in his quadratic Frobenius test,
one can create even better quadratic tests. In particular, it was shown that choosing parameters from quadratic non-residues modulo n (based on the Jacobi symbol) makes far stronger tests, and is one reason for the success of the Baillie–PSW primality test.
For instance, for the parameters (P,2), where P is the first odd integer that satisfies , there are no pseudoprimes below .

Yet another test is proposed by Khashin. For a given non-square number n, it first computes a parameter c as the smallest odd prime having Jacobi symbol , and then verifies the congruence:
.
Similar to the above example, Khashin notes that no pseudoprime has been found for his test.  He further shows that any that exist under 260 must have a factor less than 19 or have c > 128.

Properties

The computational cost of the Frobenius pseudoprimality test with respect to quadratic polynomials  is roughly three times the cost of a strong pseudoprimality test (e.g. a single round of the Miller–Rabin primality test), 1.5 times that of a Lucas pseudoprimality test, and slightly more than a Baillie–PSW primality test.

Note that the quadratic Frobenius test is stronger than the Lucas test. For example, 1763 is a Lucas pseudoprime to (P, Q) = (3, -1) since U1764(3,-1) ≡ 0 (mod 1763) (U(3,-1) is given in ), and it also passes the Jacobi step since , but it fails the Frobenius test to x2 - 3x - 1.  This property can be clearly seen when the algorithm is formulated as shown in Crandall and Pomerance Algorithm 3.6.9 or as shown by Loebenberger, as the algorithm does a Lucas test followed by an additional check for the Frobenius condition.

While the quadratic Frobenius test does not have formal error bounds beyond that of the Lucas test, it can be used as the basis for methods with much smaller error bounds.  Note that these have more steps, additional requirements, and non-negligible additional computation beyond what is described on this page. It is important to note that the error bounds for these methods do not apply to the standard or strong Frobenius tests with fixed values of (P,Q) described on this page.

Based on this idea of pseudoprimes, algorithms with strong worst-case error bounds can be built. Müller in 2001 proposed the MQFT test with bounds of essentially .
Damgård and Frandsen in 2003 proposed the EQFT with a bound of essentially .

Given the same computational effort, these offer better worst-case bounds than the commonly used Miller–Rabin primality test.

See also
Pseudoprime
Lucas pseudoprime
Ferdinand Georg Frobenius
Quadratic Frobenius test

References

External links 
 
 
 Jacobsen, Dana Pseudoprime Statistics, Tables, and Data (data for Frobenius (1,-1) and (3,-5) pseudoprimes)

Pseudoprimes